Edilberto Domarchi Villagra (24 February 1924 – 9 May 2000) was a Chilean poet from Linares.

References

Chilean male poets
1924 births
2000 deaths
People from Linares